In mathematics, the difference of two squares is a squared (multiplied by itself) number subtracted from another squared number. Every difference of squares may be factored according to the identity

in elementary algebra.

Proof
The proof of the factorization identity is straightforward. Starting from the left-hand side, apply the distributive law to get 

By the commutative law, the middle two terms cancel:

leaving

The resulting identity is one of the most commonly used in mathematics. Among many uses, it gives a simple proof of the AM–GM inequality in two variables.

The proof holds in any commutative ring.

Conversely, if this identity holds in a ring R for all pairs of elements a and b, then R is commutative. To see this, apply the distributive law to the right-hand side of the equation and get
.

for all pairs a, b, so R is commutative.

Geometrical demonstrations

The difference of two squares can also be illustrated geometrically as the difference of two square areas in a plane. In the diagram, the shaded part represents the difference between the areas of the two squares, i.e. . Therefore, .

Another geometric proof proceeds as follows: We start with the figure shown in the first diagram below, a large square with a smaller square removed from it. The side of the entire square is a, and the side of the small removed square is b. A cut is made, splitting the region into two rectangular pieces, as shown in the second diagram. The larger piece, at the top, has width a and height a-b. The smaller piece, at the bottom, has width a-b and height b. Now the smaller piece can be detached, rotated, and placed to the right of the larger piece. Since this rectangle came from rearranging the original figure, it must have the same area as the original figure. Therefore, .

Uses

Factorization of polynomials and simplification of expressions
The formula for the difference of two squares can be used for factoring polynomials that contain the square of a first quantity minus the square of a second quantity. For example, the polynomial  can be factored as follows:

Moreover, this formula can also be used for simplifying expressions:

Complex number case: sum of two squares
The difference of two squares is used to find the linear factors of the sum of two squares, using complex number coefficients.

For example, the complex roots of  can be found using difference of two squares:

    (since )

Since the two factors found by this method are complex conjugates, we can use this in reverse as a method of multiplying a complex number to get a real number. This is used to get real denominators in complex fractions.

Rationalising denominators
The difference of two squares can also be used in the rationalising of irrational denominators. This is a method for removing surds from expressions (or at least moving them), applying to division by some combinations involving square roots.

For example:
The denominator of  can be rationalised as follows:

Mental arithmetic

The difference of two squares can also be used as an arithmetical short cut.  If two numbers (whose average is a number which is easily squared) are multiplied, the difference of two squares can be used to give you the product of the original two numbers.

For example: 

Using the difference of two squares,  can be restated as
 

Difference of two consecutive perfect squares

The difference of two consecutive perfect squares is the sum of the two bases n and n+1. This can be seen as follows:

Therefore, the difference of two consecutive perfect squares is an odd number. Similarly, the difference of two arbitrary perfect squares is calculated as follows:

Therefore, the difference of two even perfect squares is a multiple of 4 and the difference of two odd perfect squares is a multiple of 8.

Factorization of integers

Several algorithms in number theory and cryptography use differences of squares to find factors of integers and detect composite numbers.

This trick can be generalized as follows. This forms the basis of several factorization algorithms (such as the quadratic sieve) and can be combined with the Fermat primality test to give the stronger Miller–Rabin primality test.

Generalizations

The identity also holds in inner product spaces over the field of real numbers, such as for dot product of Euclidean vectors:

The proof is identical. For the special case that  and  have equal norms (which means that their dot squares are equal), this demonstrates analytically the fact that two diagonals of a rhombus are perpendicular.

Difference of two nth powers

If a and b are two elements of a commutative ring R, then .

History
Historically, the Babylonians used the difference of two squares to calculate multiplications. 

For example:

93 x 87 = 90² - 3² = 8091

64 x 56 = 60² - 4² = 3584

See also
Sum of two cubes
Binomial number
Sophie Germain's identity
Aurifeuillean factorization
Congruum, the shared difference of three squares in arithmetic progression
Conjugate (algebra)
Factorization

Notes

References

External links
difference of two squares at mathpages.com

Elementary algebra
Commutative algebra
Mathematical identities
Articles containing proofs
Subtraction